Ohlala Couple is a 2012 South Korean romantic comedy gender bender television series starring Kim Jung-eun, Shin Hyun-joon, Han Jae-suk and Han Chae-ah. It aired on KBS2 from October 1 to November 27, 2012 on Mondays and Tuesdays at 21:55 for 18 episodes.

Plot
Yeo-ok and Soo-nam's marriage is on the rocks after Yeo-ok catches her hotelier husband cheating on her with another woman. One day, they find that their souls have swapped bodies, and begin to understand each other by experiencing each other's lives.

Cast
Kim Jung-eun as Na Yeo-ok
Bang Joon-seo as young Yeo-ok
 Shin Hyun-joon as Go Soo-na
Han Jae-suk as Jang Hyun-woo
Kim Ji-hoon as young Hyun-woo
Han Chae-ah as Victoria Kim
Byun Hee-bong as old man Wolha, matchmaker of fate
Narsha as Moosan, goddess
Jung Jae-soon as Park Bong-sook
Hyun Jyu-ni as Go Il-ran
Uhm Do-hyun as Go Ki-chan
Kim Myung-guk as Han Man-soo
Song Young-kyu as Kang Jin-goo
Choi Sung-kook as Lee Baek-ho
Ryu Shi-hyun as Na Ae-sook
Robert Harley as John
Lee Deok-hee as Yeo-ok's mother
Kim Bo-mi as Victoria's mother
Nam Gyu-ri as Bae Jung-ah (cameo, ep 1)
Eugene as Min-young, Soo-nam's ex-girlfriend (cameo, ep 2)
Kim Byung-man as expert who specializes in catching cheating spouses (cameo, ep 2)
Kim Chang-ryul as Go Il-ran's blind date (cameo, ep 4)
Nam Hee-suk as man in traffic accident (cameo)
Wang Bit-na as Jin-sook (cameo)
Park Sang-myun as trainer (cameo)
Kim Soo-mi as Samshin grandmother (cameo)

References

External links
  
 
 
 

2012 South Korean television series debuts
2012 South Korean television series endings
Korean Broadcasting System television dramas
Korean-language television shows
South Korean romantic comedy television series
South Korean fantasy television series
Television series by KeyEast